"Nice to Be with You" is a 1972 song, from the album of the  same 
name, by Gallery.

Background
On Dick Clark's American Bandstand of February 26, 1972, "Nice to Be with You" - which had just debuted on that day on the Hot 100 - received a "lousy" average of 57.5, on a scale from 35 to 98, on the "Rate-a-Record" segment of the show.  Nevertheless, the group performed the song on the May 13, 1972 American Bandstand.

Chart performance
It became an international top 5 hit, reaching No. 4 on the Hot 100 and No. 1 on Cashbox, WCFL, and WLS.  It also reached No. 1 in Canada. The song reached No. 4 in Australia and No. 2 in New Zealand.

Weekly charts

Year-end charts

See also
List of Cash Box Top 100 number-one singles of 1972

References

External links
 

1972 singles
1972 songs
Sussex Records singles
Gallery (band) songs
Cashbox number-one singles
RPM Top Singles number-one singles